Psilotrichopsis is a monotypic genus of flowering plants belonging to the family Amaranthaceae. The only species is Psilotrichopsis curtisii.

Its native range is Hainan, Indo-China to Peninsula Malaysia.

References

Amaranthaceae
Amaranthaceae genera
Monotypic Caryophyllales genera